WHOI (channel 19) is a television station in Peoria, Illinois, United States, broadcasting the digital multicast network TBD. Owned and operated by Sinclair Broadcast Group, the station maintains a transmitter on Springfield Road (along I-474) in East Peoria, a section of Groveland Township, Tazewell County. WHOI was the ABC affiliate for the market until 2016.

History

WHOI was Peoria's second television station, signing-on as WTVH-TV on October 20, 1953. The station was founded by Hugh Norman and Edward Schoede. Hilltop Broadcasting, which co-owned the Peoria Journal Star bought the station in 1954. Its first studios were on Main Street in Peoria. Originally broadcasting an analog signal on VHF channel 8, it was a primary CBS affiliate but also carried shows from ABC and DuMont. WTVH lost DuMont when the network ceased operations in 1955, and lost CBS when WMBD-TV (channel 31) began broadcasting. WTVH dropped the -TV suffix in its callsign on August 3, 1955.

The Metropolitan Broadcasting Corporation, later known as Metromedia, purchased the station in 1959. In 1963, WTVH was bumped down to UHF channel 19 so that a third commercial VHF station could sign-on in the Quad Cities using that channel (the new station, WQAD-TV, is also an ABC affiliate). In 1965, Metromedia sold the station to Mid-America Media, owners of WIRL radio (1290 AM) who, on September 12 of that year, changed the call sign to WIRL-TV. It became WRAU-TV in 1971 and adopted its present calls of WHOI on March 17, 1985. The WTVH call sign was picked up by a station in Syracuse, New York in 1976.

In 1987, WHOI came under the ownership of Adams Communications following a merger with its previous owner, Forward Communications. The station was sold to Brissette Broadcasting in 1991, then to Benedek Broadcasting in 1996. When Benedek declared Chapter 7 bankruptcy in 2002, WHOI was sold to Chelsey Broadcasting instead of Gray Television. In April 2004, WHOI and KHQA-TV in the Hannibal, Missouri–Quincy, Illinois media market became two of the founding stations of Barrington Broadcasting.

WHOI carried some programming from UPN, including Star Trek: Voyager, from the network's launch in January 1995 until WAOE (channel 59) went on the air in 1999. Starting in 1998, WHOI began to run a cable-only WB affiliate. Known by the fictional call sign "WBPE", it was on channel 4 on most cable systems in the area. On September 18, 2006, when The WB and UPN merged to create The CW, "WBPE" became part of The CW Plus which is a similar operation to The WB 100+. WHOI added a new second digital subchannel to simulcast this programming to offer non-cable subscribers access to The CW. The channel then began to use WHOI-DT2 as its official calls.

WHOI has been digital-only since February 17, 2009  with the "WHOI" calls being transferred from the now-defunct analog channel 19 to the new digital channel 19 and the "WHOI-DT" call sign from the pre-transition digital channel 40 being permanently discontinued. However, the PSIP identifier still identifies the station's main channel on 19.1 as "WHOI-DT".

On March 2, 2009, it was made public that rival WEEK-TV (channel 25) would take over the operations of WHOI through joint sales and shared services agreements. It resulted in WHOI closing its longtime studios near its transmitter in Creve Coeur and moving into WEEK-TV's facility on Springfield Road, along I-474, in East Peoria. Sixteen employees were transferred to WEEK-TV but as many as thirty were laid off immediately. This left the five full-power commercial stations in the market operated by two entities; WEEK-TV already controlled the market's MyNetworkTV outlet, WAOE (owned by Four Seasons Broadcasting), under a separate joint sales agreement (JSA). WHOI's website was immediately changed to a redirect to WEEK-TV's web address. As part of the agreement, Granite-owned CBS affiliate WTVH merged its operations with Barrington's NBC affiliate WSTM-TV and low-power CW affiliate WSTQ-LP in a similar arrangement on the same day.

On February 28, 2013, Barrington Broadcasting announced the sale of its entire group, including WHOI, to the Sinclair Broadcast Group. Sinclair already owned the license of WYZZ-TV (channel 43), which was sold to Cunningham Broadcasting to satisfy Federal Communications Commission (FCC) regulations on duopoly ownership. While most of Cunningham's stations are operated by Sinclair though local marketing agreements, WYZZ is operated separately by the Nexstar Media Group at the facility of CBS outlet WMBD-TV. The sale was completed on November 25. On February 11, 2014, it was announced that Quincy, Illinois-based Quincy Newspapers would acquire WEEK-TV from Granite Broadcasting. Originally, Quincy intended to continue providing services to WHOI but Sinclair gave notice that the JSA/SSA between WHOI and WEEK-TV (which was originally set to expire in March 2017) would be terminated within nine months of Quincy closing on its purchase of WEEK-TV. The Quincy/Granite sale was completed on November 2, 2015.

On July 26, 2016, Quincy Media announced that it had acquired WHOI's ABC and CW affiliations, and would consolidate them onto subchannels of WEEK beginning August 1, 2016. As an aspect of this deal, Quincy-owned WSJV in South Bend similarly relinquished its Fox affiliation to Sinclair-owned WSBT-TV.
The ABC and CW subchannels were simulcast on WHOI for 60 days following the consolidation. After the end of the transition period, the Comet TV affiliation moved to WHOI's main 19.1 channel, making WHOI an owned-and-operated station of Comet.

On July 1, 2020, Sinclair shifted TBD to WHOI's primary channel, with Comet moving to WHOI-DT2.

Subchannels
The station's digital signal is multiplexed:

See also
Channel 4 branded TV stations in the United States
Channel 24 digital TV stations in the United States
Channel 19 virtual TV stations in the United States

References

External links

TBD (TV network) affiliates
Charge! (TV network) affiliates
Comet (TV network) affiliates
HOI (TV)
Television channels and stations established in 1953
Metromedia
Sinclair Broadcast Group
1953 establishments in Illinois